Florence Robinson Weber (August 26, 1921 – January 18, 2018) was an American geologist, pilot, and adventurer, whose work contributed greatly to Alaskan geology. Weber was a co-author on the first geologic map of the Fairbanks Quadrangle, and the engineering geology maps for the trans-Alaska pipeline route.

Early life 
Weber was born in Milwaukee, Wisconsin, the only child of a couple who originated from England and Germany. In school Florence met lifelong friend, Florence (Rucker) Collins, who accompanied her on every adventure, including getting their pilots' and automobile licenses and heading to Alaska together in 1948.

Weber graduated from high school and attended the University of Chicago (UC) where she graduated with an undergraduate degree in geology in 1943. After graduating Weber started a temporary job with Shell Oil in Houston. It was during this time that Weber decided to pursue obtaining a pilot's license after being inspired by an exhibit of US warplanes. After the war, she returned to continue her studies at UC and graduated with a masters' degree in geology in 1948. Shortly after graduating, she secured a position in Alaska with the Naval Oil Unit of the US Geological Survey. Florence explored Alaska thoroughly, taking part in multiple long river trips in the Arctic, and using her pilot's license to observe Alaska from bird's eye view.

Career 
Weber spent much of her early career in Alaska studying the structure and stratigraphy of the test wells in the Naval Petroleum Reserve No. 4 (NPR-4). The NPR-4 consisted of mostly oil and petroleum reserves and was established in 1923 by the United States federal government as a way to secure fuel in the event of war. Weber then accepted a temporary job for Shell Oil in Houston prior to accepting a job with the US Geological Survey in 1949, which was posted in Alaska. Weber continued to work in Alaska until 1954 when the Survey moved their office to Washington D.C. Florence proceeded to work in the office, writing reports for 2 years which resulted in what is known as the 12 chapters of USGS Professional Paper 305, discussing the subsurface and engineering geology aspects of the USGS exploration between 1944 and 1953. In order to return to fieldwork, she made use of her Pilots license and offered the Survey a special service of access to the interior of Alaska via seaplane.

Upon Weber's return to Alaska in 1956 she proceeded to land her seaplane on many undiscovered lakes subsequently naming many of her discoveries. Weber was featured in a National Geographic article in 1957, in which she was one of six women and one man who travelled down the Yukon River from Whitehorse to Eagle by Folboat. In August 1959, Weber married Albert Weber and together they moved to Fairbanks, Alaska. Their home acted as a communications center during the flood in 1967.

Weber's main area of expertise was the Yukon–Tanana Terrane, and in the 40 years she worked for USGS, Weber had the opportunity to partake in various studies. Weber wrote multiple reports that examined numerous routes for roads proposed across Alaska. Additionally, she co-authored the first geologic map of Fairbanks Quadrangle in 1966, and the engineering geology maps for the proposed trans-Alaska pipeline route through interior Alaska in 1971. Florence joined the Geological Society of America in 1950 and was elected to Fellowship in the Society in 1967

Florence was a co-author to preliminary geologic maps of the Livengood quadrangle that was published in 1971. She also published a series of detailed geologic maps of the Fairbanks area together with Troy Pé in 1976. In 1986m, she became a project leader for the Alaska Mineral Resource Assessment Program (AMRAP) in the Livengood area.

Retirement and death  
As long as she and her husband were physically capable, they led an active lifestyle that included, but was not limited to, skiing, canoeing, kayaking, and traveling the world. Weber spent the last nine years of her life in the Pioneer's home where she died at the age on January 18, 2018 at the age of 96.

Awards and honors 
 Weber, joined the Geological Society of America in 1950
 Elected a fellow of the society in 1967
 1987 - Honorary Doctor of Science (University of Alaska Fairbanks)
 Mid- 1990's - U.S. Department of the Interior Meritorious Service Award
 2009 - Alaska Geological Society (AGS) Honorary Membership And Distinguished Service Award

Selected publications 
The following are some of Weber's most important papers: Weber also worked on and produced a number of studies examining routes for proposed roads across Alaska.

 Cady, J., & Weber, F. (1983). Aeromagnetic map and interpretation of magnetic and gravity data, Circle Quadrangle, Alaska [Abstract]. Open-File Report. doi:10.3133/ofr83170c
 Péwé, T. L., Wahraftig, C., & Weber, F. R. (1966). Geologic map of the Fairbanks quadrangle, Alaska (No. 455).
 Weber, F. R., & Geological Survey (U.S.). (1988). Geology and mineral resources of the White Mountains National Recreation Area, East-central Alaska. Denver, Colo.?: Dept. of the Interior, U.S. Geological Survey.
 Geological Survey (U.S.), Weber, F. R., & Péwé, T. L. (1970). Surficial and engineering geology of the central part of the Yukon-Koyukuk lowland, Alaska. Washington, D.C: U.S. Geological Survey.
 Weber, F. R., American Association of Petroleum Geologists., Society of Economic Paleontologists and Mineralogists., Society of Exploration Geophysicists., & Alaska Geological Society. (1985). Geologic guide to the Fairbanks-Livengood area, East-central Alaska. Anchorage: Alaska Geological Society.
Newberry, Rainer & Bundtzen, T.K. & Mortensen, James & Weber, F.R.. (1998). Petrology, geochemistry, age, and significance of two foliated intrusions in the Fairbanks District, Alaska. US Geological Survey Professional Paper. 117-129. 
Weber, F. R., Blodgett, R. B., Harris, A. G., & Dutro Jr, J. T. (1994). "Paleontology of the Livengood quadrangle, Alaska." US Geological Survey Open-File Report, 94, 1-24. 
Campbell, D. L., Fisher, M., Fuis, G. S., Weber, F. R., Stone, D. B., & Mull, G. (1989). Alaskan Geological and Geophysical Transect.

References 

1921 births
2018 deaths
Scientists from Milwaukee
American people of English descent
American people of German descent
20th-century American geologists
American women geologists
Fellows of the Geological Society of America
United States Geological Survey personnel
Aviators from Alaska
University of Chicago alumni
Aviators from Wisconsin
21st-century American women
20th-century American women scientists